"4 Seasons of Loneliness" is a song by Philadelphia-based vocal quartet Boyz II Men. Written and produced by Jimmy Jam and Terry Lewis, the song was issued as the first single from their fourth studio album, Evolution (1997), on September 8, 1997.

Already a success on US radio, the release of the single prompted a Billboard Hot 100 debut at number two. "4 Seasons of Loneliness" was also the group's last top-10 hit in both New Zealand and the United Kingdom, debuting at number two on the New Zealand Singles Chart and number 10 on the UK Singles Chart.

Critical reception
Larry Flick from Billboard stated, "The long-anticipated "Evolution" is previewed with a heart-rending ballad that underlines the act's signature harmonies with a quietly rumbling R&B groove. Producers Jimmy Jam and Terry Lewis wisely do not fuss too much with the act's hit-making formula, which still sounds fresh after all these years - thanks mostly to the friendly and often romantic personalities the lads bring to the material. Others may be able to duplicate Boyz II Men's technical sound, but you can't manufacture vibe and personality, both of which are in ample supply here. The countdown to No. 1 starts now."

Track listings
US CD, 7-inch, and cassette single
 "4 Seasons of Loneliness" (LP version) — 4:51
 "4 Seasons of Loneliness" (B II M version) — 5:30

Canadian, UK, Australian, and Japanese CD single
 "4 Seasons of Loneliness" (radio edit) — 4:27
 "4 Seasons of Loneliness" (B II M version) — 5:30
 "4 Seasons of Loneliness" (instrumental) — 4:51
 "4 Seasons of Loneliness" (a cappella) — 4:41

UK cassette single
 "4 Seasons of Loneliness" (radio edit) — 4:27
 "4 Seasons of Loneliness" (extended Wannya mix) — 5:30

Charts

Weekly charts

Year-end charts

Certifications

Release history

References

External links
 

1997 songs
1997 singles
Billboard Hot 100 number-one singles
Boyz II Men songs
Motown singles
Music videos directed by Paul Hunter (director)
Song recordings produced by Jimmy Jam and Terry Lewis
Songs written by Jimmy Jam and Terry Lewis